Redrum is a 2022 Bangladeshi mystery thriller film written and directed by Vicky Zahed. The film stars Afran Nisho, Mehazabien Chowdhury, Azizul Hakim, Manoj Kumar Pramanik, Sallha Khanam Nadia, and Nasir Uddin Khan. It was released on  Chorki on 17 February 2022.

Plot

Cast

Release
In 10 February 2022, Chorki drops the trailer of Redrum on social media. The film was premiered on Chorki on 17 February 2022.

Reception
Shadique Mahbub Islam of The Financial Express praised the cast and the script of the film and wrote, "Vicky Zahed has set the story at the centre of the film, making it the prime focus. A thoroughly analysed script full of intriguing subtitles and a remarkable ending have made the film stand tall in the OTT original films arena".

Music
All the songs has been composed by Mahmud Hayet Arpon.

References

External links
 
 Redrum on Chorki

Chorki original films
Bengali-language Bangladeshi films
2020s Bengali-language films
Bangladeshi mystery films
Bangladeshi detective films
Bangladeshi crime thriller films
Bengali-language nonlinear narrative films